Steve Tyrell (born Stephen Louis Bilao III, December 19, 1944) is an American singer and record producer. He won a 2004 Grammy Award as the producer of the Rod Stewart studio album Stardust: The Great American Songbook, Volume III. He also hosts a jazz radio program on KKJZ at Cal State, Long Beach (California).

Tyrell was head of A&R and promotion at Scepter Records. He produced B. J. Thomas' hits "Hooked on a Feeling" and "Raindrops Keep Fallin' on My Head". He wrote "How Do You Talk to an Angel" for the TV show The Heights, "Hold On" for Jamie Walters, "It's Only Love" for B. J. and Elvis Presley, and all the songs in the teen sitcom California Dreams.

He sang "The Way You Look Tonight" on the soundtrack for Father of the Bride (1991). Tyrell inherited the annual holiday residency at the Carlyle Hotel from cabaret singer Bobby Short.

Discography
 A New Standard (Atlantic, 1999)
 Standard Time (Columbia, 2001)
 This Time of the Year (Columbia, 2002)
 This Guy's in Love (Columbia, 2003)
 Songs of Sinatra (Hollywood, 2005)
 The Disney Standards (Walt Disney, 2006)
 Back to Bacharach (Koch, 2008)
 It's Magic: The Songs of Sammy Cahn (Concord, 2013)
 That Lovin' Feeling (Concord, 2015)
 A Song for You (EastWest, 2018)
 Shades of Ray: The Songs of Ray Charles (Arts Music/Warner, 2019)

References

External links
Official site

1944 births
Living people
People from Palo Pinto County, Texas
Jazz musicians from Texas
Singers from Texas
American film score composers
American jazz singers
Grammy Award winners
American male film score composers
American male jazz musicians
St. Thomas High School (Houston, Texas) alumni